"God" is a song by English musician John Lennon, from his first post-Beatles solo album, John Lennon/Plastic Ono Band. The album was released on 11 December 1970 in the United States and the United Kingdom.

Meaning
There are three sections in the song.

In the first section, John Lennon describes God as "a concept by which we measure our pain".

In the second, Lennon chants a Descartian list of things he does not believe in, ending by stating that he just believes in himself (individuality) and Yoko (his wife). He rejects magic, the I Ching, the Bible, tarot, Hitler, Jesus, Kennedy, the Buddha, mantra, the Gita, yoga, kings, Elvis, Zimmerman (Bob Dylan), and the Beatles.

The final section describes Lennon's change since the break-up of the Beatles. While the Beatles were basically his family throughout the 1960s, he refers to Paul McCartney’s 1965 Beatles song “Yesterday”, and states that he is no longer the "Dreamweaver" or "The Walrus", but just "John”. The final line of the song, "The dream is over”, has been seen as declaring the end of the 1960s quest for meaning. "If there is a God", Lennon explained, "we're all it".

Legacy
The Irish rock band U2 wrote and recorded the song "God Part II" as an answer song to Lennon's "God". Included in U2's 1988 album Rattle and Hum, "God Part II" reprises the "don't believe in" motif from Lennon's song and its lyrics explicitly reference Lennon's 1970 song "Instant Karma!" and American biographer Albert Goldman, author of the controversial book The Lives of John Lennon (1988).

English musician David Bowie, a friend and one-time musical collaborator with Lennon, wrote and recorded the song "Afraid", which was included in his 2002 album Heathen; one of the song's lyrics, "I believe in Beatles", is a rejoinder to Lennon singing "I don't believe in Beatles" in "God".

Personnel
The musicians who performed on the original recording were as follows:
John Lennon – vocals, tack piano
Billy Preston – grand piano
Ringo Starr – drums
Klaus Voormann – bass guitar

See also 
 Religious views of the Beatles

Notes

1970 songs
John Lennon songs
List songs
Song recordings produced by John Lennon
Song recordings produced by Phil Spector
Song recordings produced by Yoko Ono
Songs critical of religion
Songs written by John Lennon
Songs about the Beatles
Songs about John Lennon
Songs about Yoko Ono
Plastic Ono Band songs
Cultural depictions of Bob Dylan
Cultural depictions of Jesus
Cultural depictions of Yoko Ono
Cultural depictions of the Beatles
Cultural depictions of John F. Kennedy
Cultural depictions of Adolf Hitler
Cultural depictions of Elvis Presley